Channel 47 refers to several television stations:
 ANTV, Indonesia on Channel 47 UHF for Jakarta territories

Canada
The following television stations operate on virtual channel 47:
 CFHD-DT in Montreal, Quebec
 CFMT-DT in Toronto, Ontario
For UHF frequencies covering 668-674 MHz:
 Channel 47 TV stations in Canada

United states
For stations operate on virtual channel 47:
 Channel 47 virtual TV stations in the United States
For UHF frequencies covering 668-674 MHz:
 Channel 47 digital TV stations in the United States
 Channel 47 low-power TV stations in the United States

Other uses
For UHF frequencies covering 668-674 MHz:
 Channel 47 TV stations in Mexico

See also
 47 (disambiguation)

47